The 2021 Christus Health Pro Challenge was a professional women's tennis tournament played on outdoor hard courts. It was the fifth edition of the tournament which was part of the 2021 ITF Women's World Tennis Tour. It took place in Tyler, Texas, United States between 25 and 31 October 2021.

Singles main-draw entrants

Seeds

 1 Rankings are as of 18 October 2021.

Other entrants
The following players received wildcards into the singles main draw:
  Reese Brantmeier
  Maria Kononova
  Maria Mateas
  Alana Smith

The following player received entry using a protected ranking:
  Han Na-lae

The following players received entry from the qualifying draw:
  Sophie Chang
  Ellie Douglas
  Katarina Kozarov
  Ashlyn Krueger
  Elizabeth Mandlik
  Whitney Osuigwe
  Aldila Sutjiadi
  Amy Zhu

Champions

Singles

  Misaki Doi def.  Harriet Dart, 7–6(7–5), 6–2

Doubles

  Giuliana Olmos /  Marcela Zacarías def.  Misaki Doi /  Katarzyna Kawa, 7–5, 1–6, [10–5]

References

External links
 2021 Christus Health Pro Challenge at ITFtennis.com
 Official website

2021 ITF Women's World Tennis Tour
2021 in American tennis
October 2021 sports events in the United States
2021 in sports in Texas